Thomas Moss (1740–1808) was minister of Brierley Hill, and of Trentham, in Staffordshire. In 1769, he anonymously published a collection of miscellaneous poems, forming a thin quarto, which he
had printed at Wolverhampton. One piece was copied by Robert Dodsley into his Annual Register, and from thence was transferred (different persons being assigned as the author) into almost every periodical and collection of fugitive verses of the day. This poem is entitled "The Beggar" (sometimes called "The
Beggar's Petition"), and contains much pathetic and natural sentiment finely expressed. Moss published another noted poem in 1783, titled The Imperfection of Human Enjoyment.

External links

Material on this page was copied from the Cyclopaedia of English Literature (1844).

1740 births
1808 deaths
English Christian religious leaders
English male poets